Turks in Jordan, also known as Turkish Jordanians or Jordanian Turks, are people of Turkish ancestry living in Jordan. These people have had a thriving presence in Jordan since the rule of the Ottoman Empire. Today, there is a minority of about 60,000 people in the country who are the descendants of the Ottoman-Turkish immigrants. In addition to this, there are also 8,262 Turkish citizens who are recent migrants to Jordan.

Notable people 
Lara Abdallat, winner of Miss Jordan 2010 (Turkish Syrian mother)
Rania Al-Abdullah, Queen of Jordan (maternal Turkish grandfather)
Muhanna Al-Dura, painter (Turkish mother)
Ahmet Düverioğlu, basketball player (Turkish mother) 
Zein Al-Sharaf Talal, Queen of Jordan (Turkish Cypriot origin) 
Prince Mired bin Ra'ad, grandson of the Turkish painter Fahrelnissa Zeid
Prince Zeid bin Ra'ad, grandson of the Turkish painter Fahrelnissa Zeid
Mihrimah Sultan, Imperial Princess of Ottoman Empire

See also
Turkish minorities in the former Ottoman Empire
Turks in the Arab world

References

Bibliography 
 
 
.
.

Jordan
Ethnic groups in Jordan
Middle Eastern diaspora in Jordan